Follins Pond is a brackish lake located on Cape Cod, separating the towns of Dennis, Massachusetts, and Yarmouth, Massachusetts.  The lake is connected to Nantucket Sound via the Bass River.

Purported connection to Vinland
Follins Pond is noteworthy primarily because there has been an attempt to connect it to the semi-legendary lost Norse colony of Vinland.
In the 1950s, Frederick J. Pohl investigated Follins Pond and claimed that he had located shore rocks along the pond into which were drilled holes that strongly resembled Norse mooring stones. The Norse were known to drill holes into which iron pins were inserted for the purpose of mooring their knarrer.

Additionally, Pohl claimed that he had uncovered the tops of posts about a foot underground, arranged in a pattern that might have been that of either a Norse shipyard or drydock. Further, at about the same time a claimed "Viking horse bone" may have been unearthed at Follins Pond.  Pohl was of the opinion that at least a few horses were brought from Greenland by the Norse on their further voyages of exploration. Pohl published a book entitled The lost discovery: Uncovering the track of the Vikings in America (New York: Norton. 1952) which detailed this claim.

The theory about a Viking connection with Follins Pond is not taken seriously by professional historians, as the evidence presented is rather scant and no archaeological finds of any significance have been made in the area since.

Some of the road names around Follins Pond have however been named to reflect this theory. A Norsemans Beach Road can be found on the eastern shore of the lake, a Norse Road on the north shore of the lake, and a Valhalla Drive and Erik's Path close to the south shore.
Additionally, along the shore of a smaller body of water known as Kelleys Bay joined to Follins Pond by the Bass River can be found Vinland Drive, Skerry Road, Saga Road, Fiord Drive, Freydis Drive, and Lief Ericson Drive (sic).
Further south, along the shores of the Bass River, can be found Lief's Lane, Legend Drive, Old Saga Drive, Rune Stone Road, Viking Rock Road, Keel Cape Drive, Erickson Way, and Mooring Lane.

In addition, articles about the purported past of Follins Pond occasionally turn up in the Cape Cod Times and other local newspapers.

See also
 Waquoit Bay

References

Other sources
Pohl, Frederick J. (1957) The Vikings on Cape Cod: Evidence from an Archaeological Discovery (Pictou, Nova Scotia: Pictou Advocate Press)

Further reading
Davis, Graeme  (2009)  Vikings in America  (Edinburgh: Birlinn Ltd.)  
Hovgaard, William  (1914) The voyages of the Norsemen to America  (New York: The American-Scandinavian Foundation) 
Tornöe, Johannes Kristoffer (1964)  Early American history: Norsemen before Columbus (Oslo: Universitetsforlaget)

External links
Article about alleged mooring stones in the area
Article about the horse bone find

Lakes of Massachusetts
Lakes of Barnstable County, Massachusetts
Pre-Columbian trans-oceanic contact
Norse colonization of North America